History Repletion: Oh! Cool Guys is a 2017 South Korean television program starring Kim Sung-joo, Ahn Jung-hwan, Han Sang-jin, Jo Se-ho and Shownu. It airs on Channel A on Saturday at 23:00 (KST) beginning 1 April 2017. From 28 May 2017, the show will air on Sundays at 20:10 (KST). The cast and guests of the show go around Korea and learn about history of Korea through various places of interest.

Cast
 Kim Sung-joo
 Ahn Jung-hwan
 Han Sang-jin
 Jo Se-ho
 Shownu (Does not appear in every episode)
 Jeon Su-hyun (History teacher in episodes 10–15)
 Lee Da-ji (History teacher in episodes 1–9)

Episodes

2017

External links
 

South Korean historical television series